Badeti Kota Rama Rao  ( – 26 December 2019), known as Badeti Bujji, was an Indian politician from Andhra Pradesh belonging to Telugu Desam Party. He was a legislator of the Andhra Pradesh Legislative Assembly. He was known as Badeti Bujji.

Biography
After passing Higher Secondary School Certificate Bujji was admitted into Sir C. R. Reddy College but did not continue his studies. He contested in 2009 as a Praja Rajyam Party candidate from Eluru but he lost to Alla Kali Krishna Srinivas. He was elected as a legislator of the  Andhra Pradesh Legislative Assembly from Eluru in 2014 as a Telugu Desam Party candidate. He also contested in 2019 as a Telugu Desam Party candidate from Eluru but he lost to Alla Kali Krishna Srinivas.

Bujji died of heart attack on 26 December 2019 at the age of 55.

References

1960s births
2019 deaths
Telugu Desam Party politicians
Praja Rajyam Party politicians
Members of the Andhra Pradesh Legislative Assembly
People from West Godavari district
Andhra University alumni